Emilio Gabriel Santelices Cuevas (Santiago March 25, 1955) is a Chilean doctor and academic. Between March 2018 and June 2019 he served as Minister of Health of the second government of Sebastián Piñera.

Biography 
He is the son of César Santelices Pinto and Emilia Eliana Cuevas Gómez. He studied at the Colegio Hispano Americano. After which he studied medicine at the Pontifical Catholic University of Chile and specialized in cardiovascular anesthesiology and transplantation in the same university. Later, he obtained a doctorate in public health from the University of Chile, a diploma in health institution administration from the same university, and a MBA from Tulane University.

He served in various positions at the Clínica Las Condes, in addition to being an academic at the University of Chile, and chairman of the board of the Corporación Médicos para Chile.

Between 2010 and 2014, he was a cabinet advisor to the Ministry of Health on issues of quality improvement and evaluation for hospitals and primary health centers. In 2018 he was appointed Minister of Health by Sebastián Piñera, 
position he left in June 2019, being replaced by Jaime Mañalich.

References 

1955 births
Living people
Chilean Ministers of Health
People from Santiago
Chilean physicians
University of Chile alumni
Pontifical Catholic University of Chile alumni
Tulane University School of Medicine alumni